ROTR can refer to:

 Rules of the road (disambiguation), in any of that term's senses (eg, transportation, entertainment)
 ROTR (video game), a shoot'em up video game for the Nintendo DS and Wii from Nibris
 The Return of the Regulator, a 2001 album by rapper Warren G
 Reviews on the Run, a video game review TV show
 Rise of the Robots, a 1994 video game
 Rise of the Tomb Raider, a 2015 video game
 Robots on the Road, a traveling robotics program for middle school students, operated by NASA's Aerospace Education Services Project
 Rock on the Range, an annual music festival held in Columbus, Ohio and Winnipeg, Canada
 Rumble on the Rock: a mixed martial arts tournament
 Run-of-the-river hydroelectricity, a type of power generation
 Star Wars: Rise of the Resistance, a Star Wars themed attraction at Disney's Hollywood Studios in Walt Disney World and Disneyland